Senator Langford may refer to:

Arthur Langford Jr. (died 1994), Georgia State Senate
Charles Langford (1922–2007), Alabama State Senate
Lorraine Langford (1923–1998), Nebraska State Senate